London Buses route 324 is a Transport for London contracted bus route in London, England. Running between Brent Cross Tesco and Elstree Centennial Park, it is operated by Metroline.

History
In 2009, Transport for London consulted on the possibility of introducing the route. Transport for London confirmed in February 2010 that the route was going ahead, and would be introduced in October. In preparation for introducing the route, route 972 which ran two return journeys per week was withdrawn, as was a shuttle bus service operated by Tesco between their Brent Cross supermarket and Brent Cross Shopping Centre. The route was introduced on 23 October 2010.

Operation of the route was taken over by Metroline on 24 October 2015.

In 2020, Transport for London launched a consultation for the extension of the route from Brent Cross to Centennial Business Park, via the Royal National Orthopaedic Hospital. Calls for the route to serve the hospital had previously been dismissed by Transport for London as it stated the extension would require an additional bus and that there was insufficient demand. In July 2021, it was announced that the extension will go ahead.

Current route
Route 324 operates via these primary locations:
 Brent Cross Tesco
 Brent Cross Shopping Centre 
 Hendon Central station 
 Colindale, Colindeep Lane
 Kingsbury, Roe Green Park
 Kingsbury station 
 Queensbury Morrisons
 Stanmore, Centenary Park
 Stanmore station 
 Royal National Orthopaedic Hospital
 Elstree Centennial Park

Frequency
Buses run every 20 minutes during Monday to Saturday daytimes, and every 30 minutes in the evenings and on Sundays.

Reception
Prior to introduction, residents along the proposed route raised concerns that the roads were too narrow for the route to operate safely, and that the route would lead to increased traffic congestion.

References

External links

Bus routes in London